René Durbák (born 18 March 1968) is a Czech weightlifter. He competed in the men's light heavyweight event at the 1992 Summer Olympics.

References

1968 births
Living people
Czech male weightlifters
Olympic weightlifters of Czechoslovakia
Weightlifters at the 1992 Summer Olympics
Sportspeople from Třinec